Rocky Blare is an American politician and insurance agent serving as a member of the South Dakota House of Representatives from the 21st district. He previously represented the same district in the South Dakota Senate from 2019 to 2021.

Blare lives outside Ideal, South Dakota with his wife, a public school teacher.

Election history

 2018: Blare was elected with 4,918 votes to the South Dakota Senate defeating Julie Bartling who received 4,084 votes.
2020: Blare was elected to the South Dakota House of Representatives with 6,330 votes; Caleb Finck was also re-elected with 5,038 votes and Jessica Hegge received 2,911 votes.

References 

Living people
People from Tripp County, South Dakota
21st-century American politicians
Republican Party South Dakota state senators
Year of birth missing (living people)